Tom Cochran is a Democratic politician from Michigan having served in the Michigan House of Representatives. Prior to his election to the House in 2012, Cochran served as a firefighter and retired as chief of the Lansing Fire Department in January 2012. He is also a former member of the Mason School Board.

References

Living people
Democratic Party members of the Michigan House of Representatives
Politicians from Lansing, Michigan
People from Mason, Michigan
Siena Heights University alumni
American fire chiefs
School board members in Michigan
21st-century American politicians
Year of birth missing (living people)